Arata may refer to :

People 
 Arata (name)
 Arata (actor), Japanese actor
 Arata (rapper), American rapper

Places and jurisdictions 
 Arata River, a river in Gifu Prefecture, Japan
 Curiate Italian for Arathia, a former Ancient city and bishopric in Cappadocia, eastern Anatolia (Asian Turkey), now a Latin Catholic titular see

See also 
 
 Aratta, land appearing in Sumerian myths surrounding Enmerkar and Lugalbanda, two early and possibly mythical kings of Uruk
 Arrata (disambiguation)